Gustave Colin (1814–1880) was a French lawyer, judge and politician.

Early life
Gustave Colin was born on April 2, 1814 in Pontarlier, France.

Career
Colin started his career as a lawyer. He later served as a judge in Morteau and Pontarlier. He wrote a thesis about the cheese industry in Franche-Comté and another study about chemical fertilizers.

Colin served as a member of the National Assembly from 1876 to 1880.

Death
Colin died on November 12, 1880 in Pontarlier.

References

1814 births
1880 deaths
People from Pontarlier
Politicians from Bourgogne-Franche-Comté
French republicans
Members of the 1st Chamber of Deputies of the French Third Republic
Members of the 2nd Chamber of Deputies of the French Third Republic
19th-century French judges